Kelly Great is an album by pianist Wynton Kelly released in 1959 by the Vee-Jay label.

Reception 

In his AllMusic review, music critic Scott Yanow wrote the album "is pretty brief, but what is here on the formerly rare session should satisfy collectors of the style".

Track listing
"Wrinkles” (Wynton Kelly) – 8:05
"Mama 'G (Wayne Shorter) – 7:42
"June Night" (Abel Baer, Cliff Friend) – 8:23
"What Know" (Lee Morgan) – 8:01
"Sydney" (Shorter) – 3:55

Personnel
Wynton Kelly – piano
Lee Morgan – trumpet
Wayne Shorter – tenor saxophone
Paul Chambers – bass
Philly Joe Jones – drums
Sid McCoy – producer
Cozy Noda – digital remastering

External links 
 Wynton Kelly - Kelly Great (1959)

References

1959 albums
Wynton Kelly albums
Vee-Jay Records albums
Instrumental albums